AFLX is a variation of Australian rules football designed in 2017 to be played on a soccer field (significantly smaller than the Australian rules oval), unlike the full 18-a-side game or the established variant for rectangular fields Nine-a-side footy (including the AFL's own variant AFL 9s), AFLX requires just seven (later increased to eight) players and games are shortened. It is most notable for its use in official Australian Football League (AFL) pre-season competitions in 2018 and 2019. 

It was founded in an attempt to appeal to a wider audience outside of its origin country of Australia. 

The AFL billed AFLX as its answer to Twenty20 or Rugby Sevens. The format of its events varied – the 2019 tournament consisted of four teams each captained by a high-profile AFL footballer. In August 2019, the AFL confirmed AFLX would not return in 2020. Despite being designed for play on a rectangular field, the AFL used only one dedicated rectangular stadium, Hindmarsh Stadium, as a venue for its AFLX competitions. The record attendance for an AFLX match is 23,828, set in 2019 at Marvel Stadium in Melbourne.

Despite its lack of popularity with spectators and the AFL's short-lived experiment with it, the variation continues to be promoted by the AFL Commission as a participation sport in development regions and areas where full sized cricket grounds are not available.

Rules
The rules of the game differed from Australian rules football in some significant ways. The game was played on a rectangular soccer-sized pitch, allowing matches to be hosted by stadiums that usually lacked the suitable field dimensions for Australian rules football. The format was modified in the second year with AFLX 2019 seeing slightly changed rules:
 Games consist of two 10-minute halves with a two-minute break at half-time
 Played on a rectangular field with dimensions similar to that of a soccer field
 Eight players on the field per team, with six players on the bench and no limit to rotations (up from the 10 players per side in 2018)
 Last touch out-of-bounds rule introduced (team that had last touch loses possession)
The field umpire will throw the ball up to begin play at the start of each half and after a supergoal is scored
 10-point super goals are registered for goals kicked from outside the 40m arc
 No marks paid for backwards kicks (except for kicks/marks inside the forward 40m arc)
 Free shot from inside the 40m arc to the opposite team in the event of a rushed behind
Players can run 20m without taking a bounce or touching the ball on the ground.

History
AFLX was first trialled at Arden Street Oval in January 2017. In March 2017, it was trialed at was first trialled on a soccer pitch at Lakeside Stadium in a match between the Port Melbourne Football Club and Coburg Football Club. It was launced by Simon Lethlean in July 2017 and later hailed by the AFL as key means of kickstarting Australian rules football in China as part of the AFL and Port Adelaide's push in to the country which was acknowledged to lacked the infrastructure to support the growth of the full 18 player game.

On 6 February 2018, the AFLX pre-season competition was launched by AFL Chief Executive Officer Gillon McLachlan at Docklands Stadium. McLachlan said that AFLX would help promote football internationally. 

The 2018 competition attracted more than 40,000 fans to tournaments in Adelaide, Melbourne and Sydney. In Melbourne, TV ratings were reported as "modest" by AFL standards, with the three events drawing an average five-city metro audience of over 120,000 on Channel Seven's secondary channels. 

In August 2019, the AFL confirmed AFLX would not return in 2020 to allow a greater focus on AFLW.

Reception
The reception to the game among fans and the media was mostly poor, with ABC Grandstand journalist Richard Hinds being particularly savage in labelling it a "hollow, unappealing, pressure-free, atmosphere-deficient, oval-in-a-rectangle hole yawn-fest".  

Con Stavros of RMIT's school of Economics, Finance and Marketing, expressed doubts about the potential of AFLX to export Australian rules football but acknowledged that using rectangular playing fields instead of the standard cricket ones would make such expansion easier.

AFL Pre-season Tournaments

See also
Nine-a-side footy
AFL 9s
International rules football

References

External links
 AFL official website
 AFLX official website

 
 
 
Australian rules football competitions in Australia